Andrzej Dluzniewski (3 August 1939 – 16 December 2012) was considered one of the greatest contemporary Polish sculptors.  He died in Warsaw, Poland when he was 73 years old.

See also
Overview of Works and Style
Biography (in Polish)

References 

1939 births
2012 deaths
Polish sculptors
Polish male sculptors